The Prince Laurent Foundation is a Belgian non-profit organization for the welfare of domestic and wild animals. It was founded in 1996, under the presidency of Prince Laurent of Belgium.

Activities
The activities of the foundation focus on four areas: 
 Veterinary dispensaries
 Belgian platform for alternative methods to animal experimentation 
 Equine Research & Welfare Fund 
 Scientific prizes and awards

See also
 Animal welfare
 KINT-IRGT
 King Baudouin Foundation

Sources
 Prince Laurent Foundation

External links
 Prince Laurent Foundation

Foundations based in Belgium
1996 establishments in Belgium
Animal welfare organisations based in Belgium
Organizations established in 1996